Trestonia assulina is a species of beetle in the family Cerambycidae. It was described by Henry Walter Bates in 1874. It is known from Nicaragua, Costa Rica, and Panama.

References

assulina
Beetles described in 1874